Sendhoora Devi (also spelled Senthura Devi) is a 1991 Tamil language family film directed by Rama Narayanan. The film stars Vivek, Kanaka and Shamili, with Senthil, Vennira Aadai Moorthy, Kumarimuthu and Kitty playing supporting roles. It was released on 22 June 1991. The film was dubbed into Telugu as Sindhoora Devi.

Plot 

Sindhu and Nandu are twin sisters but they were raised separately with no knowledge of each other. Their parents got divorced a few years back. Sindhu lives with her mother Selvi and grandfather Somasundaram while Nandu lives with her father Gopal. Gopal is a popular veterinarian and has four animals in his house : the elephant Chellappa, the dog Bhairavan, the monkey Ramu and the horse Madurai Veeran. Nandu spends a lot of time with her animals, she considers them like her friends.

One day, the criminal Jagannath ask Gopal to put two tubes (containing top secret information) in his horses' belly. Jagannath has to send the horses to Hong Kong as soon as possible. Gopal refuses to perform surgery on horses in good health and he doesn't want to break the law. Jagannath has no other choice than to kidnap Gopal's daughter. Jagannath's henchmen kidnap both of his daughters and they lock them up in a room. Sindhu and Nandu realize that they are sisters, and flee away from the place thanks to Nandu's animals. The girls hide the tubes behind a huge Mariamman statue. The girls want to unite their parents, so the twins swap their places to convince their parents. In the meantime, Jagannath is urged to recover the tubes. What transpires next forms the rest of the story.

Cast 

Vivek as Gopal
Kanaka as Selvi
Shamili as Sindhu and Nandu
Senthil as Vathalagundu Vaiyapuri
Vennira Aadai Moorthy as Somasundaram, Selvi's father
Kumarimuthu as Somasundaram's secretary
Kitty as Jagannath
Bindu Ghosh as Devotee
Sheela
Kullamani
Marthandan as Restaurant waiter
Vignesh
P. T. C
Perarasu as Villager
Sakkarai
Kumar
Vm. Manohar

Soundtrack 

The film score and the soundtrack were composed by Shankar–Ganesh.

Tamil
The soundtrack, released in 1991, features 4 tracks with lyrics written by Vaali.

Telugu

References

External links 

1991 films
1990s Tamil-language films
Children's comedy-drama films
Children's drama films
Indian children's films
Indian drama films
Hindu devotional films
Twins in Indian films
Comedy of remarriage films
Films about families
Films directed by Rama Narayanan
Films scored by Shankar–Ganesh